Baking Impossible is an American cooking competition television series that airs on Netflix, themed around baking and engineering. Each episode presents a cast of contestants with a challenge that combines baking with engineering, often described using the portmanteau "bakineering".

The first season of the series officially premiered on October 6, 2021, with judges Andrew Smyth ("bakineering" specialist), Joanne Chang (baking specialist), and Hakeem Oluseyi (engineering specialist). The show is presented by host Justin Willman.

Format 

The contestants compete in pairs, for a grand prize of $100,000. Within each pair, one contestant specializes in baking, and the other specializes in engineering. Prior to the show, none of the pairs of contestants had met before.

Each episode allows the contestant to work for up to 18 hours, after which their creations are stress tested and evaluated by the judges. At the end of each episode, one pair is voted off. The winning team of the episode gets an advantage in the next episode, such as being able to preview the stress test before the other teams, or being able to attempt the stress test more than once.

Season 1

Contestants 

 Mario and Joey 
 Sierra and Edwin
 Cindy and Taylor
 Steve and Renee
 Brandi and Menuka
 Sara and Rodolfo
 Nina and Hannah
 Vanessa and Shanice
 Randi and Jacob

Episodes

Elimination Table

References

External links 

 Baking Impossible  Netflix

Food reality television series
2021 American television series debuts
English-language Netflix original programming
2020s American reality television series
Reality competition television series